Sibari is an Italian frazione of the comune (municipality) of Cassano allo Ionio. It lies in the province of Cosenza which is part of the region Calabria.

Geography
It is located close to the Gulf of Taranto and the archaeological sites of the Ancient Greek cities of Sybaris and Thurii which can be found a few kilometers to the southeast of the town. It also has a train station.

History

It was founded in the 1960s. The town has grown after a program of land reclamation. In the 1980s and 1990s beach tourism developed in the town. The local agriculture produces citrus fruits, olives and rice. In recent years there have been numerous attempts to gain autonomy, which have failed.

References

External links

Frazioni of the Province of Cosenza
Cassano all'Ionio
Railway towns in Italy